The Pyreinoye gas field is a natural gas field located in the Yamalo-Nenets Autonomous Okrug. It was discovered in 2006 and developed by and Novatek. It began production in 2009 and produces natural gas and condensates. The total proven reserves of the Pyreinoye gas field are around 681 Billion cubic feet (19.2×109m³), and production is slated to be around 92.2 million cubic feet/day (2.6×105m³) in 2010.

References

Natural gas fields in Russia